IEV is the IATA code of Kyiv International Airport (Zhuliany).

IEV may also refer to:
 International Electrotechnical Vocabulary, technical term collection, managed by IEC 
 Indo Europeesch Verbond, a social movement and political organisation founded in 1919